Gabriel Narutowicz, the first president of Poland after regaining independence, was assassinated on 16 December 1922, five days after taking office, aged 57. He was fatally shot by Eligiusz Niewiadomski, an artist and art critic, while visiting an exhibition at Warsaw's Zachęta gallery.

Background
Poland regained independence in 1918 in the aftermath of World War I. Soon afterwards, Gabriel Narutowicz, professor of engineering, became one of the left-wing leaders in the Sejm (Polish parliament).

Following the 1921 March Constitution of Poland and the November 1922 Polish legislative election, Narutowicz was elected the first president of Poland in the Polish presidential election, 9 December 1922. His election was not accepted by the right-wing nationalist endecja faction, which staged a number of protests. Narutowicz's forthcoming murder would be the culmination of an aggressive, right wing and anti-semitic propaganda campaign vilifying him; in the background of street protests he was described, by a hostile press, an atheist, a Freemason and a Jew.

Assassination
Five days after taking office, while attending an art exhibition in the Warsaw's National Gallery of Art "Zachęta", Narutowicz was assassinated during a conversation with a British envoy. The assassin was a painter, Eligiusz Niewiadomski, who fired three shots at the president.

Aftermath
Niewiadomski had connections with the right wing National Democratic Party. During his trial, Niewiadomski stated that he wanted to kill Józef Piłsudski originally, but assassinating his ally, Narutowicz, was "a step in the fight for Polishness and for the nation." Niewiadomski was sentenced to death. His state execution took place outside the Warsaw Citadel on 31 January. Part of the right-wing camp perceived Niewiadomski as a hero. Nationalistic press and some historians kept portraying Niewiadomski in positive light, writing about his "heroic stand", "sacred convictions, "patriotic duty" and such. Within months, his grave became a right-wing shrine, and "more than three hundred babies baptized in Warsaw were given the uncommon name Eligiusz".

The murder of the first president of the Second Polish Republic and the angry canvassing against him revealed the fragility of democratic mechanisms in Poland at that time.

The murder of Narutowicz served as the inspiration and a main theme for a number of works. They include the 1977 Polish feature film Death of a President (Polish: Śmierć prezydenta), directed by Jerzy Kawalerowicz, and Wilhelm Sasnal's 2003 painting Narutowicz.

See also
Polish nationalism

References

Citations

Bibliography

Further reading

20th century in Warsaw
Narutowicz, Gabriel
1922 in politics
Terrorist incidents in Second Polish Republic
December 1922 events
1922 murders in Poland